The Dallas Carnegie Library, located off US 18 in Dallas, South Dakota, is a Carnegie library built in 1913.  It was listed on the National Register of Historic Places in 1976.

It is a Greek Revival-style brick building on a raised basement.

References

External links

National Register of Historic Places in South Dakota
Greek Revival architecture in South Dakota
Library buildings completed in 1913
Gregory County, South Dakota
Carnegie libraries in South Dakota